Metaxism is a Greek authoritarian nationalist ideology associated with Ioannis Metaxas. It called for the regeneration of the Greek nation and the establishment of a modern, culturally homogenous Greece. Metaxism disparaged liberalism, and held individual interests to be subordinate to those of the nation, seeking to mobilize the Greek people as a disciplined mass in service to the creation of a "new Greece."

Metaxas declared that his 4th of August Regime (1936–1941) represented a "Third Greek Civilization" which was committed to the creation of a culturally purified Greek nation based upon the militarist societies of ancient Macedonia and Sparta, which he held to constitute the "First Greek Civilization"; and the Orthodox Christian ethic of the Byzantine Empire, which he considered to represent the "Second Greek Civilization." The Metaxas regime asserted that true Greeks were ethnically Greek and Orthodox Christian, intending to deliberately exclude Albanians, Slavs, and Turks residing in Greece from Greek citizenship.

Although the Metaxas government and its official doctrines are sometimes described as fascist, academically it is considered to have been a conventional totalitarian-conservative governorship akin to Francisco Franco's Spain or António de Oliveira Salazar's Portugal. The Metaxist government derived its authority from the conservative establishment and its doctrines strongly supported traditional institutions such as the Greek Orthodox Church and the Greek Monarchy; essentially reactionary, it lacked the radical theoretical dimensions of ideologies such as Italian Fascism and German Nazism. The regime also lacked antisemitism, which it regarded as "distasteful".

The ideology of Metaxism was associated with Metaxas' political party, the Freethinkers' Party and the 4th of August Regime. In the post-war period it has been advocated by the 4th of August Party, the Golden Dawn party and the ELAM party.

Main ideas 
Greek nationalism: Promoted cultural purity of the Greek nation and endorsed the creation of a "Third Hellenic Civilization".
Monarchism: Considered the institution of monarchy a pillar of national unity.
Anti-communism: Metaxism was very hostile to left-wing and communist ideologies.
Anti-parliamentarianism: Denounced the way the old parliamentary system operated, as a cause of anarchy, division and economic decline.
Corporatism: Worked strongly through corporate groups and trade unions.
Clericalism: The Greek Orthodox Church was an integral aspect of the Metaxist regime.  
Protectionism: Considered the market-liberal policies of the old state to have failed.
Anti-imperialism: Opposed the domination and influence of Greece by foreign powers.

History

The ideology developed by Metaxas began with Metaxas' response to the revolution of 1922 that put in a pro-republican government in Greece. Metaxas formed the Freethinkers' Party, a monarchist party that originally supported the advancement of civil liberties, though this changed with Metaxas' evolving political views. Metaxas supported the failed counterrevolution by monarchists against the republican-oriented government on October 23, 1923, that collapsed within a week, an arrest warrant was issued for Metaxas who fled Greece to exile in Norway. The pro-republican government achieved its aim in 1924 when the Greek monarchy was deposed and a Greek republic was established. In 1924, Metaxas officially changed his position from opposition to the republic to acceptance of its institutions.

In the 1926 general election, Metaxas' Freethinkers' Party won 54 out of 250 seats in the Greek parliament, resulting in the party becoming part of Greece's coalition government and Metaxas becoming Minister of Communications. However the Freethinkers' Party collapsed in public support in the 1928 election, losing almost all of its seats, including Metaxas' own seat.

By the 1930s, Metaxas openly condemned the parliamentary system in Greece. In 1935, Metaxas' party joined other monarchist parties in an electoral coalition known as the United Royalists that called for the restoration of the monarchy, however the Freethinkers' Party won only seven seats in the election. Nevertheless, a monarchist government was formed in Greece in 1935 resulting in the restoration of King George II of Greece as head of state.

King George II had held close relations with Metaxas in the past and appointed Metaxas as Prime Minister of Greece in May 1936. Upon becoming Prime Minister, Metaxas made clear his discontent with the political deadlock between feuding political blocs in Greece's parliament and the rising labour unrest being exploited by the Communist Party of Greece. Metaxas quickly sought to crush dissent including labour unrest in the form of decrees that did not require acceptance by the Greek parliament.

On August 4, 1936, Metaxas gained the King's support for a decree that dissolved parliament.  He declared martial law, suspended civil rights such as liberty of the subject, and mobilized transport and public workers to support him. Metaxas justified these actions as necessary to prevent communist revolution. Numerous arrests were made of leftist leaders and others following these proclamations. Metaxas abolished all political parties including his own, ruling as an official independent. This date is considered the beginning of Metaxas' totalitarian rule known as the 4th of August Regime.

Metaxas was referred to by supporters as the Archigos (Leader) and promised to create a "New State" in Greece that called for Greeks to wholly commit themselves to the nation with self-control as the Spartans had done. Supporters of the 4th of August Regime justified Metaxas' dictatorship on the basis that the "First Greek Civilization" involved the Athenian dictatorship of Pericles who had brought ancient Greece to greatness.

Metaxas introduced widespread strict censorship of the press and banned literature of authors considered taboo by the regime, including literature by Karl Marx, Sigmund Freud, Leo Tolstoy, Fyodor Dostoyevsky, and Immanuel Kant.

Metaxas sought the creation of a disciplined younger generation as being critical for the future of Greece and for the strengthening of his regime and its principles that world entrench the Third Greek Civilization. In October 1936 the regime created the National Youth Organization of Greece (EON) that gained 200,000 members by 1938 and by 1939 when youth membership in the EON became mandatory, it absorbed the Boy Scouts of Greece. Members of the EON took an oath of fidelity to the principles of the 4th of August that included: embracing the institutions of the monarchy; support of national pride and faith of the Greek civilization; opposition to parliamentarianism and communism; support of the development of egalitarian, non-individualistic, virtuous citizens.

In spite of the Metaxas regime's ties to Fascist Italy and Nazi Germany it was drawn into World War II opposite the Axis Powers after the Italian invasion of Greece, Metaxas then aligned his government with the allies until Greece capitulated and yielded to occupation by the Axis powers following the Battle of Greece. Metaxas died on 29 January 1941, leaving an unfinished plan (never published), concerning a "new constitution" for Greece aiming to a new form of government without the disadvantages of the old parliamentary system.

In religious affairs, the regime followed the tradition of the state controlling and using the religious and ecclesiastic institutions. The regime was tolerant towards the religious minorities (mainly Jews and Muslims), who were mainly conservative and hostile towards the Venizelism. It was not antisemitic and prohibited antisemitic publications by certain newspapers.

Legacy 
The social control which was established by Metaxas and the ideas passed to the youth, especially through the National Youth Organisation, had a significant influence on the Greek society and the post-war political system. Some examples are the censorship, which was in use until the Metapolitefsi, and the surviving elements of a police state. In the immediate post-war era Metaxism was advocated by the 4th of August Party. The ideas of the 4th of August Regime was also an extra motive for the group of right-wing army officers who seized power in a coup d'état and led to the Greek military junta of 1967–1974. Today the only party of the Greek parliament which claims to follow the ideas of Metaxas is the right-wing extremist Golden Dawn. Other far-right parties such as Popular Greek Patriotic Union which split from the Golden Dawn also claim to follow Metaxism.

See also

Greek nationalism
Venizelism

References

External links 
 Metaxas Project, a website about the 4th of August state
 ioannismetaxas.gr, a website about Ioannis Metaxas' life, made by his granddaughter

Ioannis Metaxas
.
Greek nationalism
Political movements in Greece
State ideologies
Eponymous political ideologies
Conservatism in Greece